Eugen Enderlen (21 January 1863 – 7 June 1940) was a German physician and surgeon born in Salzburg, Austria.

In 1888 he received his medical doctorate from the University of Munich, where he worked as an assistant to Hans Ernst August Buchner and Otto Bollinger. In 1895 he obtained his habilitation at the University of Greifswald, and during the following year began work as an assistant to Ernst Küster at the University of Marburg. In 1899 he became an associate professor, and in 1904 attained the chair of surgery at the University of Basel. 

In 1908 he relocated to the University Hospital in Würzburg, and during World War I served as a general physician. In 1918 he was appointed professor of surgery at the University of Heidelberg. He died in Stuttgart on June 7, 1940, at the age of 77.

Enderlen specialized in numerous surgical procedures, including surgery of the nerves and blood vessels, as well as operations for ulcers and gallstone disorders. He developed innovative techniques in esophageal surgery, and with physiologist Ludolf von Krehl, performed stellate ganglion blocks and denervation operations on the heart. He also conducted experimental research for transplantation of blood vessels, bones and joints, etc.

With Emil Gasser (1847–1919), he was the author of Stereoskopbilder zur Lehre von den Hernien (1906).

References 
 General, Visceral and Transplantation Surgery- University of Heidelberg (biography)
 Chirurgie Klinik und Poliklinik- University of Wurzburg (translated biography)

German surgeons
Academic staff of Heidelberg University
Academic staff of the University of Würzburg
Academic staff of the University of Basel
Physicians from Salzburg
Ludwig Maximilian University of Munich alumni
1863 births
1940 deaths